Florian Kohls (born 3 April 1995) is a German footballer who plays as a midfielder for Blau-Weiß 1890 Berlin.

Career 
He made his professional debut on 23 April 2016 in a Bundesliga match against Bayern Munich.

In June 2017, Kohls joined 3. Liga side Würzburger Kickers signing a two-year deal until 2019.

References

External links 
 
 
 Florian Kohls at FuPa

1995 births
Living people
German footballers
Footballers from Berlin
Association football midfielders
Hertha BSC II players
Hertha BSC players
Würzburger Kickers players
Bundesliga players
3. Liga players
Regionalliga players